The Center for Islamic Pluralism (CIP) is a U.S.-based Islamic think tank challenging Islamist interpretations of Islam. It was founded in 2004 by eight people including the Sufi Muslim author Stephen Suleyman Schwartz and officially opened on March 25, 2005. With its headquarters in Washington, D.C., today it has subsidiaries in London and Cologne, Germany and correspondents in 32 countries of the world.

Founders
 Kemal Silay, Professor at Indiana University (CIP President)
 Stephen Suleyman Schwartz (CIP Executive Director)
 Nawab Agha, Chairman of the American Muslim Congress (CIP Shia Affairs Director)
 Zuhdi Jasser, Chairman of the American Islamic Forum for Democracy
 Ahmed Subhy Mansour, Former professor, Al-Azhar University, Cairo
 Salim Mansur, Professor at University of Western Ontario (CIP Canadian Director)
 Khaleel Mohammed, Ass. Professor at San Diego State University
 Tashbih Sayyed, Publisher of Muslim World Today

Other staff 
 Dr. Irfan al-Alawi, CIP International Director
 Veli Sirin, CIP Germany Director
 Kamal Hasani, CIP General Studies Director
 Daut Dauti, CIP UK Research Director
 Jalal Zuberi, CIP Southern U.S. Director
 Imaad Malik, CIP Prison Outreach Director

References

External links
 

Islamic organizations based in the United States
Faith and theology think tanks in the United States
Liberal and progressive movements within Islam
Think tanks based in Washington, D.C.
Think tanks established in 2004